

Karl Eglseer (5 July 1890 – 23 June 1944) was a general in the Wehrmacht during World War II who commanded the XVIII Corps. He was a recipient of the Knight's Cross of the Iron Cross. Eglseer was killed in an air crash in Austria on 23 June 1944.

Life and career
Karl Eglseer was born in Bad Ischl in Upper Austria on 5 July 1890. He entered the Austro-Hungarian Army in August 1908 as an ensign, serving in World War I. Remaining in the Austrian Bundesheer after 1918, he transferred to the Wehrmacht after the Anschluss with Germany in 1938.

In October 1940 he was promoted to command the 4th Mountain Division, serving in Army Group South on the Eastern Front. In October 1941 he was awarded the Knight's Cross of the Iron Cross for his leadership of the division. Eglseer then led the 714th Infantry Division in Yugoslavia from February 1943 to December 1943, when he became commander of the XVIII Army Corps on the Northern sector of the Eastern Front.

On 23 June 1944 the aircraft carrying Eglseer, as well as Generals Dietl, von Wickede and Rossi, crashed in the Styria region of Austria. There were no survivors. At the time of his death Eglseer held the rank of General of Mountain Troops.

Awards
Austro-Hungarian Empire
 Karl Troop Cross
 Military Merit Cross, 3rd class with war decoration and swords

Nazi Germany 
 Iron Cross (1939) 2nd and 1st Class
 Knight's Cross of the Iron Cross on 23 October 1941 as Generalmajor and commander of 4. Gebirgs-Division

References

Citations

Bibliography

 
 

1890 births
1944 deaths
People from Bad Ischl
Generals of Mountain Troops
Austro-Hungarian military personnel of World War I
Recipients of the Knight's Cross of the Iron Cross
Gebirgsjäger of World War II
Victims of aviation accidents or incidents in Austria
Austro-Hungarian prisoners of war
World War I prisoners of war held by Russia
Austro-Hungarian Army officers